Peyghambarieh (Persian: پیغمبریه) is a mosque and shrine in Qazvin, Iran. Located to the west of Chehelsotun, it was built during Safavid times and was repaired and had parts added to it in later times. There is an inscription on it however, that cites the date of construction as 1913-1914.

It is said that it is the resting place for four Jewish prophets or saints. It is also said that it might be the burial place for the biblical magi.

It is listed in the national heritage sites of Iran by the number 1774.

References 

Qazvin
Safavid architecture
National works of Iran